Rich Kids of Beverly Hills (stylized as #RichKids of Beverly Hills) is an American reality television series that premiered on E!, on January 19, 2014. The series focuses on the lives of a group of twenty-something millionaires and billionaires (by inheritance) showcasing their lives.

Production and development  
Dorothy was found on Instagram by the casting directors. She went in for an interview with the production company and they told her to bring in her friends. She brought in Morgan Stewart and they did an on camera interview tape. Six weeks later the show was greenlit at E!. Morgan also revealed that on the first day of filming she and the cast did not realise how much work goes into filming a reality show. She explains that after the first week of filming she was so exhausted and she was sick throughout the filming of season one because she didn't have the stamina and never had to work so hard on something.

The show premiered on January 19, 2014.

On March 26, 2014, it was announced that the show had been renewed for a second season, which premiered on August 3, 2014.

In April 2015, E! renewed the show for a third season along with Taylor Ann Hasselhoff joining the series. The third season premiered on May 24, 2015.

In December 2015, it was announced that E! had renewed the show for a fourth season which premiered on May 1, 2016.

In 2016, it was also announced Roxy Sowlaty would no longer be a part of the series.

In 2016, it was announced on her Instagram account that Bianca Espada would join the show. Morgan Stewart and Dorothy Wang also served as Producers in the fourth season.

After filming for season 4, E! announced that cast member EJ Johnson will get his own spin off entitled EJNYC.

On November 3, 2016, it was announced that the show, along with EJNYC, would not be returning.

In 2022, Dorothy Wang appeared in season 2 of the Netflix series Bling Empire and now appears on its spin-off, Bling Empire: New York.

Cast
The show originally focused on Dorothy Wang, Morgan Stewart, Brendan Fitzpatrick, Jonny Drubel and Roxy Sowlaty.

EJ Johnson appeared in season one in a guest capacity and was promoted to a Series Regular for the second season.

Taylor-Ann Hasselhoff was cast as a series regular for the third season. This was also the last season for Sowlaty and Hasselhoff.

Bianca Espada was cast as a Series Regular for the fourth season. EJ's sister Elisa Johnson and close friend Drew Mac made frequent appearances throughout the season. Also Morgan's mother Susan and Brendan's friends Saachi and Bobby made appearances. Former Shahs of Sunset star Lilly Ghalichi also made a guest appearance.

Morgan Stewart and Brendan Fitzpatrick got married in the series finale. In August 2019 they filed for divorce.

In 2021, Dorothy Wang was cast for the second season of Bling Empire. A Netflix Original reality series described as the real life version of Crazy Rich Asians.

Episodes

Season 1 (2014)

Season 2 (2014)

Season 3 (2015)

Season 4 (2016)

Spin-offs
After the first season premiered, it was reported that a spin-off had been ordered by the network titled Rich Kids of New York. Paparazzi photos showed a group of ladies filming in New York City with a production team, however nothing was ever moved forward and aired.

On June 19, 2016, EJNYC premiered on the E! network. The show focused on EJ Johnson and his fashion career in New York City and lasted one season.

Reception

Reviews for the show have been largely negative and the show has been widely panned by critics. Andy Swift of HollywoodLife.com wrote that "the biggest downside to Rich Kids is that it knows how ridiculous it is. The stars are very much aware they’re on a show, and the whole thing couldn’t feel more scripted. Basically, it's gross." Tracie Egan Morrissey of Jezebel.com wrote "Ultimately, though, these people are as boring as they are rich, and not worth watching on television," and "none of the people on the show seem to recognize that their words might have any meaning — probably because they typically don't." Writing for The New York Times, Jon Caramanica wrote "The show is inspired by Rich Kids of Instagram, a Tumblr devoted to gently needling, and maybe gently envying, young people who gleefully show off their wealth on that photo- and video-sharing service. The result is a document of young narcissists relentlessly documenting themselves."

The show has been criticised for promoting materialism and its characters using wealth that they did not earn themselves.

References

External links

Rich Kids of Beverly Hills Instagram

2010s American reality television series
2014 American television series debuts
2016 American television series endings
English-language television shows
Television shows set in Beverly Hills, California
E! original programming
Mass media portrayals of the upper class